The Archdiocese of St. Louis is a Latin Church ecclesiastical territory or archdiocese of the Catholic Church that covers the City of St. Louis and the Missouri counties of Franklin, Jefferson, Lincoln, Perry, Saint Charles, Saint Francois, Ste. Genevieve, St. Louis, Warren, and Washington. It is the metropolitan see of the ecclesiastical province containing three suffragan sees: Diocese of Springfield-Cape Girardeau, the Diocese of Jefferson City, and the Diocese of Kansas City-Saint Joseph.

It was led from 2009 to 2020 by former Bishop of Saginaw Robert James Carlson, who was named the archbishop-elect on April 21, 2009, by Pope Benedict XVI and installed on June 10, 2009. Archbishop Carlson was assisted by Auxiliary Bishop Robert Joseph Hermann, who retired in 2010. Then, Auxiliary Bishop Edward Matthew Rice served from 2010 to 2016, and was in turn replaced by Mark Steven Rivituso, who was appointed in 2017. Carlson's predecessor as Archbishop was Raymond Leo Burke, who transferred to the position of Prefect of the Supreme Tribunal of the Apostolic Signatura on June 27, 2008.  Carlson retired on June 10, 2020, and on that day, Mitchell Thomas Rozanski, the Bishop of Springfield in Massachusetts, was appointed his successor.

The archdiocesan cathedral is the Cathedral Basilica of St. Louis. The original cathedral and mother church is the Basilica of St. Louis, King of France.

History

Early history 
The first parish of Saint Louis was established in 1770 by French settlers to the region. The parish was then part of the Diocese of San Cristobal de la Habana, based in Havana, Cuba. It was later incorporated into the Diocese of Louisiana and the Two Floridas when it was erected on April 25, 1793, which originally encompassed the entire Louisiana Purchase as well as the Florida peninsula and the Gulf Coast. The oldest parish in the diocese is St. Genevieve parish founded in 1759 in Ste. Genevieve, Missouri

Pope Pius VI erected the Diocese of Louisiana and the Two Floridas encompassing the pioneer parishes of St Louis, New Orleans, and Louisiana and both Florida colonies on April 25, 1793, taking its territory from the Diocese of San Cristobal de la Habana, based in Havana, Cuba. The diocese originally encompassed the entire territory of the Louisiana Purchase, from the Gulf of Mexico to British North America, as well as the Florida peninsula and the Gulf Coast.  This date of erection makes the present Roman Catholic Archdiocese of St Louis and the Archdiocese of New Orleans the second oldest Catholic dioceses in the present United States after the Roman Catholic Archdiocese of Baltimore, which the same pope had erected as the Diocese of Baltimore on November 6, 1789. The new diocese encompassed the area under the Spanish crown as Luisiana, which was all the land draining into the Mississippi River from the west, as well as Spanish territory to the east of the river in modern-day Mississippi, Alabama, and Florida.

In April 1803, the United States purchased Louisiana from France, which had in 1800 forced Spain to retrocede the territory in the Third Treaty of San Ildefonso. The United States took formal possession of St Louis, then part of Upper Louisiana, on March 10, 1804. John Carroll, the Bishop of Baltimore, served as apostolic administrator of the diocese from 1805 to 1812.

The area's first bishop was Louis William Valentine Dubourg, who on September 24, 1815, was appointed Bishop of Louisiana and the [East and West] Two Floridas by Pope Pius VII. He was the Bishop of the Louisiana Territory from 1815 to 1826. DuBourg chose to set up his episcopal see in St. Louis. In 1823, Pope Pius VII appointed Joseph Rosati to the office of coadjutor bishop of the diocese.

On August 19, 1825, Pope Leo XII erected the Apostolic Vicariate of Alabama and the Floridas, taking its territory from the Roman Catholic Archdiocese of Louisiana and the Two Floridas. Although the two Florida territories were no longer part of the diocese, he did not change its title. But soon after, Bishop Rosati abruptly resigned the office of coadjutor bishop during a trip to Rome after which the Vatican decided to split the diocese again, making St. Louis a separate see. On July 18, 1826, the same pope
 Erected the Diocese of St. Louis, taking its territory from the Diocese of Louisiana and the Two Floridas and the Diocese of Durango,
 Erected the Apostolic Vicariate of Mississippi, taking its territory from the Diocese of Louisiana and the Two Floridas,
 Erected the Diocese of New Orleans, taking its territory from the Diocese of Louisiana and the Two Floridas, and
 Appointed Bishop Rosati as apostolic administrator of both the Diocese of New Orleans and the Diocese of St. Louis.

Diocese 
After Bishop Dubourg's resignation and transfer to lead the diocese of Montauban, France, the diocese of Louisiana was split, giving New Orleans a bishop again, and the Diocese of St. Louis was erected on July 18, 1826, by Pope Leo XII. When founded, it included the state of Missouri, the western half of Illinois, and all American territory west of the Mississippi River and north of the state of Louisiana. It was the largest American diocese, equaling in extent all of the other nine dioceses.

Its first bishop, Joseph Rosati, led the Catholic Church's expansion of its presence in these areas, and built its first cathedral, now known as the Basilica of St. Louis, King of France. He was the Bishop of St. Louis from 1826 to 1843.

On July 28, 1837, territory in Iowa, Minnesota, and the Dakotas was taken from the Diocese to form the Diocese of Dubuque, Iowa.

Until 1840, the "Old Cathedral" was the only church in the city. By 1850, there were 10: Cathedral of St. Louis, St. Mary of Victories, St. Francis Xavier, St. Patrick, St. Joseph, St. Vincent de Paul, St. John the Apostle, Sts. Peter and Paul, Holy Trinity, and St. Michael.

Archdiocese 
The St. Louis Diocese was elevated to an Archdiocese on July 20, 1847, by Pope Pius IX.

Because of its strong Catholic identity and having been the mother diocese of many dioceses in the midwest, the archdiocese was often referred to as the Rome of the West. It is dedicated to Saint Louis IX and has as its copatrons Saints Vincent de Paul and Rose Philippine Duchesne. St. Louis IX, the patron of the archdiocese, represents the ideal Christian knight- a fervent layman, a man of honor and a leader unafraid of exhibiting his ardent spirituality. In 1833 a French laymen answered what the Second Vatican Council calls the universal call to holiness of all Christians. Blessed Frederic Ozanam founded the St. Vincent de Paul Society to serve the poor. The first chapter of the society in the United States was started in St. Louis in 1845, led by Judge Bryan Mullanphy, who later became mayor of the city of St. Louis. Mother Rose Philippine Duchesne and the Religious of the Sacred Heart opened the first school for girls west of the Mississippi, in St. Charles in 1818.

The Cathedral Basilica of Saint Louis contains the largest collection of mosaics in the world and is one of St. Louis' most impressive architectural treasures. The Cathedral of St. Louis was dedicated in 1926 on the 100th anniversary of the establishment of St. Louis as a diocese. An imposing structure – solid, permanent, huge – the building's richly colored interior mosaics are a visual prayer. Built under the direction of Archbishop John Glennon – the last Irish-born Bishop of St. Louis – and completed under the leadership of Archbishop John May, every impressive inch of the cathedral is used to tell the story of salvation and the history of the Catholic faith lived in St. Louis. Work on the cathedral mosaics would not be completed for 60 years. The Cathedral of St. Louis was designated a "Basilica" in 1997 on the 150th anniversary of the archdiocese.

St. Louis Preparatory Seminary in the countryside which is now the St. Louis suburb of Shrewsbury was completed in 1931. Later it became Cardinal Glennon College. Today it is the archdiocesan seminary Kenrick-Glennon Seminary.

In January 1999, the archdiocese was host to a two-day visit from Pope John Paul II, the first time a pope had visited the city. It was not John Paul's first visit, since 30 years earlier, he had paid a visit when he was Cardinal Wojtyła, Archbishop of Kraków.

Sexual Abuse
In July 2019, the Archdiocese of St. Louis released the names of 64 clergy who were "credibly accused" of committing acts of sexual abuse while serving in the Archdiocese.

On August 16, 2019, "sexually violent priest" Frederick Lenczycki, who had previously served prison time in Illinois between 2004 and 2009 for acts of sexual abuse, was sentenced to 10 years in prison  months after pleading guilty to sexually abusing a boy in St. Louis County.

Bishops
The following is a list of the bishops and archbishops of St. Louis, and coadjutors and auxiliary bishops of St. Louis; and their years of service.

Bishop of Louisiana and the Floridas
 Louis-Guillaume-Valentin Dubourg (1812–1826), appointed Bishop of Montauban and later Archbishop of Besançon

Bishops of St. Louis
 Joseph Rosati, C.M. (1827–1843)  - John Timon (Appointed Coadjutor Bishop in 1839, but did not take effect); appointed Prefect Apostolic of the Republic of Texas in 1840 and later Bishop of Buffalo
 Peter Richard Kenrick (1843–1847); Elevated to Archbishop

Archbishops of St. Louis
 Peter Richard Kenrick (1847–1895)
 John Joseph Kain (1895–1903)
 Cardinal John J. Glennon (1903–1946)
 Cardinal Joseph Ritter (1946–1967)
 Cardinal John Joseph Carberry (1968–1979) 
 John L. May (1980–1992)
 Justin Francis Rigali (1994–2003), appointed Archbishop of Philadelphia (Cardinal in 2003)
 Raymond Leo Burke (2004–2008), appointed Prefect of the Apostolic Signatura and later Patron of the Order of Malta (Cardinal in 2010)
 Robert James Carlson (2009–2020)
 Mitchell T. Rozanski (2020–present)

Auxiliary Bishops
 Christian Herman Winkelmann (1933–1939), appointed Bishop of Wichita
 George Joseph Donnelly (1940–1946), appointed Bishop of Leavenworth
 John Patrick Cody (1947–1954), appointed Coadjutor Bishop and Bishop of Kansas City-Saint Joseph and later Coadjutor Archbishop and Archbishop of New Orleans and Archbishop of Chicago (Cardinal in 1967)
 Charles Herman Helmsing (1949–1956), appointed Bishop of Kansas City-Saint Joseph
 Leo Christopher Byrne (1954–1961), appointed Coadjutor Bishop and Bishop of Wichita and later Coadjutor Archbishop of St. Paul and Minneapolis
 Glennon Patrick Flavin (1957–1967), appointed Bishop of Lincoln
 George Joseph Gottwald (1961–1988)
 Joseph Alphonse McNicholas (1969–1975), appointed Bishop of Springfield in Illinois
 Charles Roman Koester (1971–1991)
 Edward Thomas O'Meara (1972–1979), appointed Archbishop of Indianapolis
 John Nicholas Wurm (1976–1981), appointed Bishop of Belleville
 Edward Joseph O'Donnell (1983–1994), appointed Bishop of Lafayette
 James Terry Steib (1983–1993), appointed Bishop of Memphis
 Paul Albert Zipfel (1989–1996), appointed Bishop of Bismarck
 Edward Kenneth Braxton (1995–2001), appointed Bishop of Lake Charles and later Bishop of Belleville
 Michael John Sheridan (1997–2001), appointed Bishop of Colorado Springs
 Joseph Fred Naumann (1997–2004), appointed Archbishop of Kansas City in Kansas
 Timothy Michael Dolan (2001–2002), appointed Archbishop of Milwaukee and later Archbishop of New York (Cardinal in 2012)
 Robert Joseph Hermann (2002–2010)
 Edward Matthew Rice (2010–2016), appointed Bishop of Springfield-Cape Girardeau
 Mark Steven Rivituso (2017–present)

Other priests of this diocese who became bishops

 Michael Portier, appointed Vicar Apostolic of Alabama and the Floridas in 1825 and later Bishop of Mobile
 Patrick A. Feehan, appointed Bishop of Nashville in 1865 and later Bishop and Archbishop of Chicago
 John Hennessy, appointed Bishop (in 1866) and later Archbishop of Dubuque
 John Joseph Hogan, appointed Bishop of Saint Joseph in 1868 and later Bishop of Kansas City
 Joseph Melcher, appointed Bishop of Green Bay in 1868 (1853 appointment as Bishop of Quincy did not take effect)
 John Joseph Hennessy, appointed Bishop of Wichita in 1868
 John Henry Tihen (priest here, 1886–1888), appointed Bishop of Lincoln in 1911 and later Bishop of Denver in 1917
 Christopher Edward Byrne, appointed Bishop of Galveston in 1918
 Mark Kenny Carroll, appointed Bishop of Wichita in 1947
 Marion Francis Forst, appointed Bishop of Dodge City in 1960 and later Auxiliary Bishop of Kansas City in Kansas
 Andrés Bernardo (Andrew Bernard) Schierhoff, appointed Auxiliary Bishop of La Paz in 1968 and later Prelate of Pando
 Luis Morgan Casey, appointed Auxiliary Bishop of La Paz in 1983 and later Apostolic Vicar of Pando
 John Joseph Leibrecht, appointed Bishop of Springfield-Cape Girardeau in 1984
 John R. Gaydos, appointed Bishop of Jefferson City in 1997
 George Joseph Lucas, appointed Bishop of Springfield in Illinois in 1999 and later Archbishop of Omaha
 Robert William Finn, appointed Coadjutor Bishop in 2004 and later Bishop of Kansas City-Saint Joseph
 Richard Frank Stika, appointed Bishop of Knoxville in 2009

Churches

Schools
There are 100 Archdiocesan/parochial and 9 private elementary schools.

There are 12 Archdiocesan and 15 private Catholic high schools:
 Barat Academy, Chesterfield
 Bishop DuBourg High School, St. Louis †
 Cardinal Ritter College Prep High School, St. Louis
 Chaminade College Preparatory School, Creve Coeur @
 Christian Brothers College High School, Town & Country @
 Cor Jesu Academy, Affton %
 De Smet Jesuit High School, Creve Coeur @
 Duchesne High School, St. Charles
 Incarnate Word Academy, Bel-Nor %
 John F. Kennedy Catholic High School, Manchester † (closed 2017)
 Nerinx Hall High School, Webster Groves %
 Notre Dame High School, Lemay %
 Rosati-Kain High School, St. Louis †%
 St. Dominic High School, O'Fallon
 St. Elizabeth Academy, St. Louis % (closed 2013)
 St. Francis Borgia Regional High School, Washington
 St. John Vianney High School, Kirkwood @
 St. Joseph's Academy, Frontenac %
 Saint Louis Priory School, Creve Coeur @
 St. Louis University High School, St. Louis @
 St. Mary's High School, St. Louis †@
 St. Pius X High School, Festus †
 St. Vincent High School, Perryville
 Trinity Catholic High School, North County † (closed 2021)
 Ursuline Academy, Oakland %
 Valle Catholic High School, Sainte Genevieve
 Villa Duchesne and Oak Hill School, Frontenac %
 Visitation Academy of St. Louis, Town and Country %

†Archdiocesan high schools that are owned and operated by the Archdiocese

@ All-boys school

% All-girls school

Cemeteries
The Archdiocese Office of Catholic Cemeteries operates 17 cemeteries in the region, including:

Resurrection 
Sts. Peter & Paul 
Mt. Olive 
Calvary
Sacred Heart 
St. Charles Borromeo 
St. Peter 
St. Ferdinand 
St. Monica 
Our Lady 
Holy Cross 
St. Vincent 
Ste. Philippine 
St. Mary's 
Ascension
Glencoe
Queen of Peace

Suffragan sees

Diocese of Jefferson City
Diocese of Kansas City-Saint Joseph
Diocese of Springfield-Cape Girardeau

See also

 Catholic Church by country
 Catholic Church in the United States
 Ecclesiastical Province of Saint Louis
 Global organisation of the Catholic Church
 List of Roman Catholic archdioceses (by country and continent)
 List of Roman Catholic dioceses (alphabetical) (including archdioceses)
 List of Roman Catholic dioceses (structured view) (including archdioceses)
 List of the Catholic dioceses of the United States

References

External links
Roman Catholic Archdiocese of St. Louis Official Site
Archives section
Story of John Paul II's 1999 visit
St. Louis Review, the weekly newspaper of the archdiocese
Rome of the West, features photography of churches in the Archdiocese
Eastern rites in the Archdiocese:
 Eparchy of Our Lady of Lebanon (Maronite) 
 The Byzantine Catholic Eparchy of Parma
 Saint Nicholas Eparchy for Ukrainian Catholics

 
Saint Louis
Christianity in St. Louis
Religious organizations established in 1826
Culture of Greater St. Louis
Saint Louis
1826 establishments in Missouri